Wheel of Fate may refer to:
 Wheel of Fate (Ferris wheel), at the Enchanted Kingdom theme park in Santa Rosa, Laguna, Philippines
 Wheel of Fate (film), a 1953 British drama
 Rota Fortunae, a concept in medieval and ancient philosophy referring to the capricious nature of fate